I Love a Man in Uniform may refer to:
I Love a Man in Uniform (film), a 1993 Canadian film directed by David Wellington
"I Love a Man in Uniform," a song by Gang of Four from their 1982 album Songs of the Free